Jakov Blagaić (born 8 February 2000) is a Croatian footballer who plays for Borac Banja Luka, as an attacking midfielder.

Club career
Blagaić started his senior career with Hajduk Split in the Croatian First Football League, where he has made nine league appearances during the 2019–20 season.

References

External links
HNS profile

2000 births
Living people
Footballers from Split, Croatia
Association football midfielders
Croatian footballers
Croatia youth international footballers
HNK Hajduk Split players
NK Olimpija Ljubljana (2005) players
NK Široki Brijeg players
First Football League (Croatia) players
Croatian Football League players
Slovenian PrvaLiga players
Premier League of Bosnia and Herzegovina players
Croatian expatriate footballers
Croatian expatriate sportspeople in Slovenia
Expatriate footballers in Slovenia
Croatian expatriate sportspeople in Bosnia and Herzegovina
Expatriate footballers in Bosnia and Herzegovina